Air Bourbon was a short-lived airline headquartered at Roland Garros Airport in Sainte Marie, Réunion.

History

Air Bourbon
The airline was created by the French company Group Bourbon in November 2002 and started scheduled services to mainland France on 7 June 2003 with one Airbus 340-211 (ex-Air Tahiti Nui leased from Airbus Assets). The first route was Reunion (RUN) to Paris-Orly (ORY) via Lyon (LYS). 
During 2003 the airline had up to 196 staff (mostly former Air Lib and Aero Lyon employees),  including 21 pilots, 61 cabin crew and 115 ground staff.

After operations had to be ceased again shortly thereafter due to financial constraints, a recapitalisation of the airline was announced in January 2004, but in December of the same year the airline was liquidated and shut down.

Air Comores International
An effort to relaunch the company under the new name Air Comores International (to be based in Moroni, Comoros, again offering flights to France) failed, and it finally went out of business in 2006.

Services 

Air Bourbon operated scheduled services between Réunion and Lyon, Milan, Paris and the neighboring island of Mayotte.

Fleet 
The Air Bourbon fleet consisted of a single Airbus A340-200 (F-OITN) aircraft, which was equipped with 286 passenger seats, 36 of which could be accommodated in business class.

See also 
 List of defunct airlines of the Comoros

References

Literature 
 OAG Official Airlines Guide and Jetstream magazines

External links
Air Bourbon (Archive) 
Last homepage archived

Defunct airlines of Réunion
Airlines established in 2002
Airlines disestablished in 2004
2002 establishments in Réunion